This is a list of Old Johnians (abbreviated OJs), former pupils of St. John's School, Leatherhead, which is a public school in Surrey, England.

A
 Richard Acworth (born 1936), Archdeacon of Wells from 1993 to 2003
 David Alesworth, ARBS (born 1957), artist based in Pakistan
 The Rt Rev. Hugh Ashdown (1904–1977),  8th Bishop of Newcastle
 Dan Anahory (born 1993) entrepreneur

B
 David Balcombe (born 1984), cricketer
 Edward Alexander Bannister CMG KC (born 1942), former Commercial Court Judge of the Eastern Caribbean Supreme Court based in the BVI
 Thomas Barfett MA (1916–2000), Archdeacon of Hereford, Canon Residentiary at Hereford Cathedral between 1977 and 1982
 Robert Stanley Warren Bell (1871–1921), novelist, journalist and first editor of The Captain 	
 The Rev. Dr. Anthony Bird (1931–2016), priest, physician and academic
 The Rt Rev. Jim Bishop (1908–1994), Suffragan Bishop of Malmesbury
 John Blair FSA, FBA (born 1955), Professor of Medieval History and Archaeology at the University of Oxford and Fellow of Queen's College, Oxford
 Paul Boissier (1881–1953), former headmaster of Harrow School, wartime civil servant and cricketer
 John Westerdale Bowker (born 1935), Honorary Canon of Canterbury Cathedral, consultant to UNESCO, BBC broadcaster, author and editor
 Peter Bruinvels (born 1950), former Conservative MP
 Septimus Brutton (1869–1933), cricketer	
 Sir Paul Bryan DSO MC (1913–2004), former Conservative MP
 The Rt Rev. Mark Bryant (born 1949), 2nd Bishop of Jarrow
 John Burgess (1928–2015), Ireland Rugby International
 Ronald Burroughs  (1917–1980), diplomat, Her Majesty's Ambassador to Algeria between 1971 and 1973
 Rupert Bursell KC (born 1942), barrister and priest

C

 Sir Henry Calley DL DFC DSO (1914–1997), senior officer in the RAF during World War II, local politician and owner of a stud farm
 Basil Fulford Lowther Clarke (1908–1978), priest and architectural historian
 Rear Admiral Christopher Clayton (born 1951), former senior officer in the Royal Navy
 Victor Clube (born 1934), first class cricketer and astrophysicist
 John Collinson (1911–1979), cricketer
 John Cook (1918–1984), composer, organist and church musician
 James Cope (born 1966), cricketer
 The Ven. Alexander Cory (1890–1973), Archdeacon of the Isle of Wight
 Air Commodore James Baird Coward AFC (1915–2012), senior officer in the Royal Air Force
 Walter Crawley (1880–1940), lawn tennis player who competed in the 1908 Summer Olympics
 Sir Peter Cresswell DL (born 1944), former judge of the High Court

D

 The Rt Rev. Edward Darling (born 1933), Bishop of Limerick and Killaloe between 1985 and 2000
 Jenkin Alban Davies (1885–1976), Wales Rugby International
 The Rt Rev. Stephen Davies (1883–1961), Bishop of Carpentaria
 Giles Dilnot (born 1971), BBC Daily Politics Political Correspondent and co-presenter
 Wing Commander John Dowland  (1914–1942), senior officer in the Royal Air Force who was awarded the GC
 Lancelot Driffield (1880–1917), cricketer
 Peter Drury (born 1967), football commentator
 Kenneth Durham (1954–2016), educator

E

 Basil Ede (1931–2016), wildlife artist
 John Hugh David Eland FRS (born 1941), chemist
 Mohamed A. El-Erian (born 1958), President of Queens' College, Cambridge, businessman
 The Ven. John Mascal Evans (1915–1996), Archdeacon of Surrey between 1968 and 1980
 Arthur Evanson (1859–1934), England Rugby International
 Wyndham Evanson (1851–1934), England Rugby International
 Sir Anthony Ewbank QC (1925–2011), judge

G
 Sir Richard Lavenham Gardner FRSB FRS (born 1943), embryologist and geneticist
 Paymaster J.T. Gedge (1878–1914), first British officer to be killed in the First World War
 Professor Nigel Glendinning (1929–2013), authority on Goya and 18th Century Spanish literature
 The Rt Rev. Ronald Goodchild (1910–1998), Bishop of Kensington between 1964 and 1980
 Geoffrey Grigson (1905–1985), poet, anthologist and critic
 Air Commodore John William Boldero "Jack" Grigson DSO, DFC & Two Bars (1893–1943), senior British officer in the Royal Air Force
 Sir Wilfrid Vernon Grigson CSI (1896–1948), soldier, senior civil servant and colonial administrator

H

 John Harvey (1911–1997), architectural historian
 Sir David Hatch CBE (1939–2007), BBC Radio manager and producer
Richard Haughton (born 1980), rugby sevens referee and former rugby union player
 Gavin Hewitt (born 1951), Europe Editor of BBC News
 Robert Lockhart Hobson CB (1872–1941), Keeper, Department of Oriental Antiquities and Ethnography at the British Museum
 The Ven. George Hodges (1851–1921), Archdeacon of Sudbury
 Paymaster-Captain Basil Hood CBE DSO (1886–1941), senior officer in the Royal Navy
 Sir Anthony Hope (1863–1933), author of adventure novels such as The Prisoner of Zenda
 Major-General Malcolm Hunt OBE RM (born 1938), Commanding Officer of 40 Commando RM during the Falklands War

J
 Michael James (born 1934), cricketer
 Gwilliam Iwan Jones (1904–1995), photographer and anthropologist
 Farouk S.M. Jamal (born 1951), Fellow of the Royal Institution of Chartered Surveyors (retired); first British Asian Chartered Surveyor in Mayfair; Accredited Appraiser, Canada

K
 George Kruis (born 1990), England Rugby International

M

 Claudia MacDonald (born 1996), England Rugby International 
 Alex Macqueen (born 1973), actor
 The Rt Rev. Morris Maddocks (1928–2008), bishop
 Humfrey Malins CBE (born 1945), former Conservative MP
 Sir Arthur Wellington Marshall DL (1841–1918), High Sheriff of Cambridgeshire and Huntingdonshire in 1890
 Very Rev. Peter Jerome Marshall (born 1940), Dean of Worcester, 1997–2006, now Emeritus
 Christopher Matthews (1950–2004), businessman
 Air Vice Marshal Forster Herbert Martin "Sammy" Maynard, CB, AFC (1893–1976), World War II flying ace
 The Very Rev. John Methuen (1947–2010), Dean of Ripon between 1995 and 2005
 Guy Michelmore, composer and former news presenter
 Patrick Ferguson Millard (1902–1972), artist
 Roger Milner (1925–2014), actor, author and dramatist.
 Philip Morgan, cricketer, athlete, clergyman and educator
 James Morwood (1943–2017), classicist

N
 L. Everard Napier CIE FRCP (1888–1957), physician specialising in tropical medicine
 Lllewellyn Charles Nash (1868–1918), Ireland Rugby International
 Andrew Norriss (born 1947), author and TV sitcom writer

P
 The Very Rev. John Penfold (1864–1922), Dean of the Island and Bailiwick of Guernsey and its Dependencies
 Thomas Perkins (1870–1946), cricketer
 Sir Stephen Herbert Pierssené (1899–1966), General Director of Conservative Central Office between 1945 and 1957
 Denys Campion Potts (1923–2016), scholar and authority on French literature

R

 Reverend Vivian Redlich, missionary in Papua New Guinea when the Japanese invaded in 1942, beheaded in August that year
 Jonathan Rendall (1964–2013), author
 Lieutenant Commander Eric Gascoigne Robinson VC (1882–1965)
 Tom Rogan (born 1986), journalist
 Lord Richard Rogers (1933–2021), architect
 Sir Robert Romer GCB PC FRS (1840–1918), judge
 The Rt Rev. David Rossdale (born 1953), former Bishop of Grimsby
 Squadron Leader Peter Rothwell (1920–2010), bomber pilot, key figure in the defence of Malta during World War II

S
 
 Dr Louis Charles Arthur Savatard Hon.M.Sc., L.S.A. (1874–1962), dermatologist
 Lt.-Col. Derek Seagrim VC (1903–1943)
 Charles Haslewood Shannon (1863–1937), artist
 The Rt Rev. E.D. Shaw (1860–1937), cricketer and later Bishop of Buckingham
 Victor Silvester OBE (1900–1978), dancer, musician and bandleader
 Nicholas Smith (1934–2015), actor
 Air Commodore Ian Stewart, senior officer in the Royal Air Force
 Claude Stokes CIE DSO OBE (1875–1948), Indian Army officer, later diplomat
 Raymond Toole Stott MBE (1910–1982), bibliographer, historian of the circus and its allied arts
 Patrick Sykes (1925–2014), England Rugby International
 Wymond Cory Symes (1867–1961), businessman, sportsman and member of the Bombay Legislative Council

T

 Sir Thomas Shenton Whitelegge Thomas GCMG GCStJ (1879–1962), last Governor of the Straits Settlements
 Simon Thomas (born 1973), former Blue Peter presenter
 John Henry Thorpe OBE (1887–1944), Conservative MP
 Ryan Trevitt (born 2003), professional footballer
 Sir Arthur Charles Trevor, KCSI (1841–1920), senior civil servant and colonial administrator
 Dr Robert Twycross FRCP FRCR (born 1941), Macmillan Clinical Reader in Palliative Medicine, Oxford University, 1988–2001, now Emeritus

V

W
 The Ven. Ted Ward (1919–2005), Archdeacon of Sherborne and Chaplain of the Royal Chapel in Windsor Great Park
 Sir Telford Waugh KCMG (1865–1950), diplomat
 John Wells (born 1939), Professor of Phonetics, University College London, 1988–2006, now Emeritus
 Edward Allan Wicks CBE (1923−2010), Organist, Canterbury Cathedral, 1961–88
 William Williams (1866–1945), Wales Rugby International
 The Rt Rev. Leonard Wilson (1897–1970), priest, Bishop of Singapore 1941–49, Dean of Manchester 1949–53, Bishop of Birmingham 1953—69
 The Ven. Mark Wilson (born 1946), Archdeacon of Dorking, 1996–2005
 Sir Wilfrid Wentworth Woods KCMG KBE (1876–1947), colonial administrator
 Lieutenant Geoffrey Harold Woolley VC (1892–1968), the first Territorial Army officer to win the VC
 Sir Leonard Woolley (1880–1960), archaeologist

References

St John's School, Leatherhead
People educated at St John's School, Leatherhead
Surrey-related lists